The EKR (Eksperimentalnaya Krylataya Raketa, or experimental winged rocket) was a Soviet intermediate range cruise missile designed by the Korolev design bureau based on B. Chertok's elaboration of the German R-15 cruise missile design.

History
By 1951 - 1953 the Korolev bureau had prepared an experimental design, incorporating a  prototype astronavigation system. In 1953 an expert commission examined the design and felt that there were still many technical problems needing to be solved, which would be better handled by an aircraft designer rather than Korolev. Additionally, Korolev's chief priority was the development of the R-7 ICBM. In 1954 a government decree authorised the Lavochkin and Myasishchev aircraft design bureaus to proceed in parallel with full-scale development of trisonic intercontinental cruise missiles.

Design
The EKR as designed by Korolev would have been a Mach 3 ramjet, accelerated to supersonic cruise speed by an R-11 rocket booster. Smaller than the missile proposed by the Germans, it would have had a range of 730 km with a flight time of 927 seconds, a lift to drag ratio of 2.51, and a wing area of 3.31 m².

Specifications

General characteristics
Function: Nuclear cruise missile
Launch mass: 7,874 kg (17,359 lb)
Total length: 21.00 m (68.00 ft)
Launch platform: Launch pad
Status: Canceled

Launch booster (stage 1)
Function: Launch booster
Engine: S2.253 rocket engine
Length: 8.29 m (27.19 ft)
Diameter: 0.88 m (2.88 ft)
Thrust: 107.333 kN (24,129 lbf)
Oxidizer: LOx
Combustible: Kerosene

Cruise missile (stage 2)
Engine: 1× EKR ramjet
Speed : Mach 3
Range: 730 km
Flight altitude: 
Warhead: 200 kg (440 lb)
Length: 9.43 m (30.95 ft)
Diameter: 0.65 m (2.13 ft)
Wing span: 2.02 m (6.62 ft)
Wing area: 3.31 m²

References

Cruise missiles of the Cold War
Cold War guided missiles of the Soviet Union
Cruise missiles of the Soviet Union
Ramjet engines